Romeo Raphael Lahoud (22 January 1931 – 22 November 2022) was a Lebanese theatre director, composer, and author.

Biography
As a writer, set designer, producer, and director, he played a part in over 30 musicals which featured prominent figures in Lebanese theatre, such as Sabah and Salwa Al Katrib.

Lahoud studied theatrical directing in Las Vegas and scenography at La Scala in Milan under professor Carlo Montecamozzo. He founded five theatres: Le Phoenicia, Le Martinez, L’Élysée, Le Romeo Lahoud, and L'Athénée. He also founded a folkloric troupe in Libya in 1967. He was the first Arab and Lebanese artist to perform at the Olympia in Paris and the Palais Royal des Beaux Arts in Brussels.

Romeo Lahoud died on 22 November 2022, at the age of 91.

Works
Al Shallal (1963)
Mawal (1965)
Mijana (1966)
Ataba (1967)
Les nuits libanaises (1967)
La Citadelle (1968)
Faramane (1970)
Mahrajane (1971)
Phenicie 80 (1971)
Awassef (1971)
Mine jaouz mine (1972)
Singof Singof (1974)
W Harab Chahine (1975)
Bint el Jabal (1977)
Amira Zmorrod (1978)
Ismak bi Albi (1978)
Oxygene (1979)
Yasmine (1980)
Namroud (1981)
Superstar (1981)
Hikayat Amal (1983)
Al Helm el Telett (1985)
Layali Zamane (1995)
Tariq El chams (2014)
Caricature (2016)

References

1931 births
2022 deaths
Lebanese composers
Lebanese male writers
People from Amsheet